Than Swe (born 28 November 1941) is a Burmese historian, writer, and a former deputy Minister of Culture of Myanmar. He writes under the pen name Maung Than Swe (Dawei) (မောင်သန်းဆွေ (ထားဝယ်)). He is known for his writings on Burmese history, specializing on the Konbaung period. His well-known works include Konbaung Shindan (Discourse on the Konbaung Period) and Konbaung Alun (Beyond Konbaung). He has published over 50 books during his career. He has also served as vice-chairman of the Myanmar History Commission. In 2013, he won the Thuta Swezon Literature Award for history with the book Hti Thadin, Nan Thadin.

Works
Over 50 books including:
Ratnagiri Khayi-the (Ratnagiri Traveller)
The Royal Audiences
Konbaung Alun (Beyond Konbaung)
Konbaung Shindan (Discourse on the Konbaung Period) 
Nanmadaw Me Nu Shindan (Discourse on Queen Nanmadaw Me Nu)
The Moon Princess Sao Sanda (ကမ္ဘောဇ မင်းသမီးလေး စဝ်စန္ဒာ)
Hna-lon-tha San-Ein (The Love Story of Katya & the Prince of Siam)
Hti Thadin, Nan Thadin ("Palace News")

References

20th-century Burmese historians
Government ministers of Myanmar
21st-century Burmese historians
Living people
1941 births